Takanashi (written: 高梨) is a Japanese surname. Notable people with the surname include:

, Japanese professional wrestler
, Japanese samurai
, Japanese samurai
, Japanese manga artist
, Japanese actress and gravure idol
, Japanese ski jumper
, Japanese manga artist
, Japanese samurai
, Japanese anime composer
, Japanese photographer
, Japanese volleyball player

See also
Takanashi clan, Japanese clan

Japanese-language surnames